The Fuel of Life is a 1917 American silent drama film directed by Walter Edwards and starring Belle Bennett, Eugene Burr and Texas Guinan.

Cast
 Belle Bennett as Angela De Haven
 Eugene Burr as Rader
 Texas Guinan as Violet Hilton
 Tom Guise as Goldman 
 Edward Hayden as Old Creede
 Lee Hill as Roger De Haven
 Estelle La Cheur as Mrs. Goldman
 Alberta Lee as Mrs. Spalding
 Frank Newburg as Bob Spalding 
 Lee Phelps as Leonard Durant
 J. Barney Sherry as Bragdon Brant
 Margaret Shillingford as Mrs. Van Der Croot

References

Bibliography
 Katchmer, George A. A Biographical Dictionary of Silent Film Western Actors and Actresses. McFarland, 2015.

External links
 

1917 films
1917 drama films
1910s English-language films
American silent feature films
Silent American drama films
American black-and-white films
Triangle Film Corporation films
Films directed by Walter Edwards
1910s American films